Geoffrey G Parker is a scholar whose work focuses on distributed innovation, energy markets, and the economics of information. He co-developed the theory of two-sided markets with Marshall Van Alstyne.

His current research includes studies of platform business strategy, data governance, and technical/economic systems to integrate distributed energy resources.

Parker is Professor of Engineering and Director, Master of Engineering Management, (MEM) Thayer School of Engineering at Dartmouth College, the first national research university to graduate a class of engineers with more women than men. He has set the Thayer School of Engineering apart with the introduction of Data Analytics and Platform Design classes, emphasizing the business aspects of engineering and giving engineers the background they need to be business innovators and entrepreneurs. Parker is part of a unique culture that is breaking gender barriers.

Parker is also a Faculty Fellow at MIT and the MIT Center for Digital Business. Parker is co-author of the book Platform Revolution, which was included among the 16 must-read business books for 2016 by Forbes.

Early life and education

Geoffrey Parker was born in Dayton, Ohio. He received a BS in Electrical Engineering and Computer Science from Princeton University in 1986. He then completed the General Electric Company Financial Management Training Program and held multiple positions in engineering and finance at General Electric in North Carolina and Wisconsin. He obtained an MS in Electrical Engineering (Technology and Policy Program) in 1993 and a PhD in Management Science in 1998, both at the Massachusetts Institute of Technology.

Career
Parker is Professor of Engineering and Director, Master of Engineering Management, Thayer School of Engineering, Dartmouth College. In addition, he is a Fellow at MIT's Initiative on the Digital Economy where he leads platform industry research studies and co-chairs the annualMIT Platform Strategy Summit. Parker is a visiting scholar at the MIT Sloan School. His teaching includes platform strategy courses that provide managers the tools they need to understand the digital economy and technical courses that give students the skills they need to transform large data sets into actionable knowledge. He was formerly Professor of Management Science at Tulane University where he served as Director of the Tulane Energy Institute. Parker has taught undergraduate and full-time MBA courses as well as professional MBA and executive MBA programs.

Parker served as a National Science Foundation panelist from 2009 to 2011. He is a senior editor for the journal Production and Operations Management, an associate editor for the journal Management Science and President of the Industry Studies Association. Parker is a member of General Electric’s Learning Advisory Board, consisting of academics drawn from across Africa, the United States of America and the United Kingdom, that assists in development and broadening of skills across Africa.

Parker co-organizes and co-chairs the annual MIT Platform Strategy Summit, an executive meeting on platform-centered economics and management, where he stressed the growth of platforms, their welfare implications and their takeover of government functions. At the same time, he co-chairs an academic meeting, the Platform Strategy Research Symposium. Parker served as chair of the U.S.-Israel Energy Summit in 2014.

Work 

Parker has made significant contributions to the field of network economics and strategy as co-developer of the theory of two-sided markets with Marshall Van Alstyne.

Parker and Van Alstyne observed that, unlike traditional value chains with cost and revenue on different sides, two-sided networks have cost and revenue on both sides, because the “platform” has a distinct group of users on each side. Their approach has been described as the “chicken and egg” problem of how to build a platform. They concluded that the problem must be solved by platform owners, typically by cross-subsidizing between groups or even giving away products or services for free. Two-sided network effects can cause markets to concentrate in the hands of a few firms. These properties inform the strategies and antitrust law approaches at all firms involved in the network.

His research includes studies of distributed innovation, business platform strategy, and platforms to integrate intermittent energy.

Parker is a frequent keynote speaker and advises senior leaders on their organizations’ platform strategies. Before attending MIT, he held positions in engineering and finance at GE.

Publications 

Parker's research has appeared in journals such as Harvard Business Review, MIT Sloan Management Review, Energy Economics, Information Systems Research', Journal of Economics and Management Strategy,  Management Science, Production and Operations Management, and Strategic Management Journal. His work has also been featured on business news publications such as “MarketWatch” and Wired.

He is the co-author of Platform Revolution: How Networked Markets Are Transforming the Economy and How to Make Them Work for You. The book describes the information technologies, standards, and rules that make up platforms, and are used and developed by the biggest and most innovative global companies. Forbes included it among 16 must-read business books for 2016, describing it as "a practical guide to the new business model that is transforming the way we work and live."

Parker also co-wrote Operations Management For Dummies within the For Dummies franchise.

Awards 

Parker won the Wick Skinner Early Career Research Accomplishments Award in 2003. He was given the Dean's Excellence in Teaching Award for Graduate Education at Freeman School of Business in 2014.

References

External links 
 
 Platform Economics
 Platform Revolution
 Articles available for download at SSRN

Living people
Economists from Ohio
Information economists
Innovation economists
Information systems researchers
Energy economists
Tulane University faculty
MIT School of Engineering alumni
21st-century American economists
Year of birth missing (living people)